Nikolai Lebedev may refer to:
 Nikolai Lebedev (actor) (1921–2022), Soviet and Russian actor
 Nikolai Lebedev (film director) (born 1966), Russian film director
 Nikolai Andreevich Lebedev (1919–1982), Russian mathematician 
 Nikolai Georgiyevich Lebedev (1901–1992), head of the Soviet Civil Administration in Korea (present-day North Korea) from 1947 to 1948
  (1914–1942), Hero of the Soviet Union for whom the asteroid 2342 Lebedev is named